Wolf Bachofner (born 1961 in Vienna, Austria) is an Austrian stage and film actor.

In Vienna he got private lectures in speaking and studying parts. After this education he was engaged at the Landestheater Linz, in Vienna, Klagenfurt and also in Frankfurt and from 1997 on at the "Deutsches Schauspielhaus" in Hamburg. He played in The Cherry Orchard (Der Kirschgarten, Anton Chekhov), Athena (Pallas Athene, Herbert Achternbusch), Danton's Death (Dantons Tod, Igor Bauersimas) and also in William Shakespeare's Twelfth Night, or What You Will (Was ihr wollt).

He got international popularity through his part as criminal detective Peter Höllerer in the  Austrian-made (ORF) police television drama  Inspector Rex (Kommissar Rex), where he was involved in 59 episodes.

Films and television (selection)
1992: Dead Flowers
1994-1999: Inspector Rex (Kommissar Rex) (series)
1995: Nachtbus (Night Bus, shortfilm)
1995: Die Ameisenstraße (Ant Street)
1997: Qualtingers Wien
1997: Tatort (series, episode Eulenburg)
1998: Männer
1999: Schlachten!
1999: Viehjud Levi (Jew-Boy Levi)
2000: Jedermann
2002: Ikarus (Icarus)
2004: Eva Blond (serie, episode Der Zwerg im Schließfach)
2005: Ich bin ein Berliner
2005: SOKO Wismar (series, episode Notwehr)
2005: Mutig in die neuen Zeiten – Im Reich der Reblaus
2006: Der Winzerkönig (series, episode Blinde Eifersucht)
2006: Mutig in die neuen Zeiten – nur keine Wellen

External links
 

1961 births
Living people
Austrian male television actors
Austrian male stage actors
Austrian male film actors
Male actors from Vienna